Exalted is a high fantasy tabletop role-playing game originally published by White Wolf Publishing in July 2001. The game is currently in its third edition. It was originally created by Robert Hatch, Justin Achilli and Stephan Wieck, and was inspired by world mythologies and anime.

Influences
The setting is strongly influenced by Tanith Lee's Tales from the Flat Earth, Michael Moorcock's Hawkmoon, Lord Dunsany's The Gods of Pegana and Yoshiaki Kawajiri's Ninja Scroll. Other influences include Glen Cook's The Black Company; Sean Stewart's Resurrection Man, The Night Watch, and Galveston; Homer's Odyssey, the Bible, and Wu Cheng'en's Journey to the West.

System 
The game uses ten-sided dice and a variation of the Storyteller System to arbitrate the action, and, as with many other RPGs, requires little beyond the rulebooks themselves, dice, pencil, and paper. The Exalted version of the rules were derived from the trilogy of White Wolf Publishing games Trinity (formerly known as Aeon), Aberrant, and Adventure! where the idea of a fixed target number of 7 or higher was first introduced.

Characters may be frequently presented with challenges that normal human beings, even within the context of the game, would find difficult, deadly, or simply impossible. However, as the chosen champions of greater powers, each Exalt possesses Charms, which may either enhance their natural capabilities or manifest as shows of great power. An Exalt with low-level archery charms might find her arrows hitting with preternatural accuracy, while greater faculty might allow her to shoot without difficulty to the edge of her vision, or turn a single arrow into a deadly rain of ammunition.

The Exalted frequently power their charms with accumulated Essence, a universal energy that flows through and comprises Creation and other worlds. While normally their Essence recovered slowly through rest, in the first two editions they could also regain it more quickly by performing stunts, actions given special description and embellishment by the players. In the third edition stunts no longer regenerate Essence, but combat automatically causes Essence stores to refill quickly. However, stunts continue to exist, and their primary benefit—adding extra dice to the actions they describe, thus enhancing the possibility of success—remains.

History 
Exalted has mechanical and thematic similarities to White Wolf's previous game series, the old World of Darkness, but exists in its own product line, called the Age of Sorrows. The game has a sales record on par with the company's flagship title, Vampire: The Masquerade, the second edition core rulebook achieving a sales ranking at #23,558 on Amazon.com with a 4.5-star mean user review rating based on 31 user reviews as of January 2019.

The initial advertisements for Exalted placed the Age of Sorrows as the pre-history of the old World of Darkness. Meanwhile, some oWoD supplements also supported this; the Hunter Apocrypha gave a vision of the past that said that Hunters gained their power from the broken shards of the souls of great heroes of a lost age, which seems to suggest that Hunters carry fragments of Solar Essences. Likewise, the Kindred of the East supplement gave a structure of the Wheel of Ages (mirrored in Exalted first edition books as the Ages of Man) that seemed to accommodate the integration of Exalted and the classic World of Darkness, the former the first and second age, and the latter being the fifth age.

However, once the game was released such connections rapidly became uncertain: names and themes from the World of Darkness line run throughout the material, but rarely in a way that suggested a direct connection between one and the other. Per the commentary of multiple developers, the connections are deliberately tenuous, allowing players to be free to treat it as a prehistory or as its own world as it may suit their individual game. The similarities between Exalted and the Chronicles of Darkness are even weaker, primarily intersecting only where the Chronicles reused material from its predecessor. The Second Edition briefly implies that its story is the prehistory of our own world on its back cover, but this idea is not explored in any depth beyond this; while the last book of Second Edition would posit a modernized world with the Exalted, it was clearly a technologically advanced version of Creation – the world of Exalted – rather than Earth.

Shards of the Exalted Dream, the final 2nd edition product, was published in January 2012. Development of Exalted 3rd Edition was officially announced in October 2012. A Kickstarter crowdfunding campaign for Exalted 3rd edition ran in 2013 from May 9 to June 8, reaching its $60,000 funding goal within 18 minutes, raising a total of $684,755 and breaking Numenera's record for the most funded tabletop RPG Kickstarter.

Promotions 
In March 2008, White Wolf Publishing unveiled a promotion that would allow 2,500 Dungeons & Dragons players to exchange their copy of their 3.5 Edition Player's Handbook for a copy of the Exalted Second Edition Core Rulebook. The promotion was called "Graduate your Game" and has received mixed reviews from fans of both games. The success of this promotion was not revealed.

Setting

Background 
The history of the setting begins with the Primordials: vast entities akin to Greek primordial deities or the Outer Gods of H. P. Lovecraft's works, even going so far as to use similar epithets to the latter. They shaped Creation – a flat world of finite extent – from the primordial chaos, and placed the gods to watch over it.

In time, the gods decided to overthrow the Primordials, but were forbidden from taking arms against their makers. Instead, the most powerful of the gods imbued exceptional humans with their power (the titular Exalted) to fight for them; the blessings they bestowed (also known as Exaltations) would pass on to new champions with their death, allowing a new hero to rise when one fell. Upon victory, the gods retreated to the Heavenly city of Yu-Shan to oversee from on high, and left Creation to the Exalted and Humanity.

However, the Exalted suffer from the "Great Curse," uttered upon the dying breaths of the slain Primordials. The Solar Exalted—those empowered by the Unconquered Sun and mightiest among the Exalted—eventually grew decadent and corrupt from this influence, and were slaughtered in a massive insurrection known as the Usurpation by their servants and advisors. After the Usurpation, the majority of the Exaltations of the Solar Exalted were locked away, and an organization known as the Wyld Hunt was organized to kill all the others, and to drive the Lunar Exalted from the civilized lands of Creation.

During the intervening age, the Terrestrial Exalted became the rulers of the world, ruling in a shogunate. After the Great Contagion (a plague originating from the lands of the dead) and the Balorian Crusade (a war with the Fair Folk) wrought devastation across Creation, a young captain of the Dragon-Blooded armies gained access to powerful weapons of the First Age. With these, she saved Creation and then asserted her rulership over much of the it, dubbing herself the Scarlet Empress. Nearly eight hundred years later—in the present day of the game—there are eleven Great Houses of the Realm, nearly all of whom claim direct descent from the Empress.

Five years prior to the default starting point of the game, the Empress vanished. By the present of the game it is believed she will not return, and the Realm stands on the brink of civil war. Simultaneously, the Solar exaltations locked away have returned. With the Houses ignoring the threat of the Celestial Exalted to position themselves to take control of the Realm, the number of Solar Exalted in Creation is growing. Thus, the backdrop to the setting sees the newly arisen Solars (among various other heroes and villains) struggling to survive long enough to make their mark upon the fate of Creation, for good or for ill.

The flat world of Creation is the primary setting of Exalted. Creation has two continents, the Blessed Isle and an unnamed super-continent which covers the northern, eastern and southern edges of Creation, populated by many nations and tribes, with the settled regions along the inner coast of this super-continent being known collectively as the threshold. The Blessed Isle is located in the center of Creation. The Realm rules the Blessed Isle and its proximate archipelago directly, and indirectly rules numerous tributary states known as satrapies along the threshold.

Surrounding Creation is the infinite ocean of pure chaos known as the Wyld. The cosmology of Exalted also includes the Underworld, the celestial city of Yu-Shan, the demon realm of Malfeas, and the machine world of Autochthonia.

Types of Exalts 
At the core of the setting, there are several different types of Exalted, any type of which could play the role of protagonist or antagonist of the game. The Exalted of Creation can be divided into two categories: Terrestrial Exalted and Celestial Exalted. Celestial Exalted, being the chosen of the Celestial Incarnae, are significantly more powerful than Terrestrial Exalted, and can live for millennia, but their numbers are limited by a fixed number of Exaltations passing from mortal life to mortal life at any given time. Terrestrial Exalted are the chosen of the Elemental Dragons; while less powerful, the Dragon-Blooded inherit Exaltation from their ancestors.

The Abyssal, Alchemical, and Infernal Exalted technically fall outside of the two categories, though their power level is comparable to that of Celestial Exalted. A brief synopsis of each type is given here, organized by relative power and significance within the game.

Most types of Exalted have certain collective predispositions toward or against other Exalt types by culture, and may be viewed differently by the various mortals of Creation. Centuries of Terrestrial hegemony and propaganda play a part in this: the Dragon-Blooded and their world-spanning empire are often seen as demigods and heroes, for instance, while the Lunar Exalted are often seen as monstrous and dangerous.

Solar Exalted (Chosen of the Unconquered Sun, Lawgivers) 
The default protagonists of Exalted and the champions of the chief of the gods, a being known as the Unconquered Sun. There are five castes of Solar Exalted: Dawn (warriors and generals), Zenith (priest-kings of the Unconquered Sun), Twilight (scholars and sorcerers), Night (spies and assassins) and Eclipse (ambassadors and diplomats).

Solars are regarded as monstrous demons by much of the mortal world due to centuries of propaganda by the Realm.

The nature of Solar charms tends to express itself instead through human excellence taken to superhuman extremes, and as such their raw prowess in most skills easily exceeds any of the others.

Abyssal Exalted (Chosen of the Void, Deathknights) 
Loyal servants of the Deathlords, the Abyssal castes are a dark reflection of their Solar counterparts; Dusk (soldiers, generals, and martial champions), Midnight (priests and leaders), Daybreak (scholars and artisans), Day (assassins and spies), and Moonshadow (bureaucrats and diplomats).

In the present of Exalted, the Neverborn sow their revenge from beyond the grave through their Deathlord servants. The source materials, primarily the second-edition sourcebook The Manual of Exalted Power: Abyssals, present the Deathlords as the vengeful ghosts of First Age Solars slaughtered in the Usurpation. They have varied goals, but most strive not to conquer or corrupt Creation, save as a path to the Neverborn's desire: the complete destruction of existence.

The greatest agents of the Deathlords in the world of the living are the Abyssal Exalted, also known as Deathknights: dark reflections of the Solar Exalted. They field vast undead armies, bolstered by ancient knowledge long since lost to the living but still readily available among the lingering dead, and a powerful form of magic known as necromancy. Several sourcebooks present the Abyssals and the Deathlords as having a tentative foothold in Creation, representing a grave threat.

Lunar Exalted (Chosen of Luna, Stewards) 
Presented as the most anarchistic and chaotic of the Exalted. In the sourcebooks, they are often referred to as cunning shapeshifters, skilled fighters, and capable generals.

Within the game's history, they were very tightly bound to the First Age Solars. While many stood and died beside their Solar friends and spouses in the Usurpation, others fled to the edges of Creation and remade themselves to fight a long war against the Dragon-Blooded. Lunars now follow at best a loose tribal hierarchy and often ritually tattoo each other to protect themselves from the warping effects of the Wyld.

Second edition materials detailed the Lunar Exalted's subversive influence on Creation's societies and revealed the Thousand Streams River Project, a complicated system of social engineering designed to create self-sufficient human societies that do not require Exalted leadership to function. Several major societies within the game were declared the results of centuries of subtle, behind-the-scenes guidance, with varying degrees of success.

Sidereal Exalted (Chosen of the Five Maidens, Viziers) 
These Celestial Exalted are few, yet are described as major players in the fate of Creation. Sidereals are peerless martial artists and excel at foreseeing and manipulating fate. They are often presented as secret agents of the Bureau of Fate of the Celestial City of Yu-Shan, the home of the gods, directing events in the mortal world from behind the scenes.

They were the viziers, prophets and cunning advisers of the First Age. Toward the end of the First Age, a prophecy came to them that warned that without action, Creation would fall to darkness. Seeking to save the world, the Sidereals looked into the future and saw two options: attempt to reform of their maddening kings, or destroy the Solar Exalted and raise up the Dragon-Blooded in their place. The Sidereals, possibly under the effects of the Great Curse laid upon them by the Neverborn, elected the path that offered a guaranteed future for Creation. As such, they orchestrated the end of the First Age, known as the Great Usurpation.

Sidereals slip from the minds of those who meet them, mortal and Exalt alike, which can be beneficial to Sidereal characters or harmful, depending on their intended goals as player characters and non-player characters. Some unpredicted events prior to the "present" setting of Exalted, such as the Great Contagion, have jarred their faith in their precognitive abilities. Meanwhile, the loss of the Scarlet Empress, their secret ally at the top of the Scarlet Dynasty, has greatly weakened their influence.

In the present, a growing rift between the Bronze Faction (which supports the Dragon-Blooded hegemony) and the Gold Faction (which backs the newly returned Solars) renders the Sidereal Exalted uncertain of their future.

Terrestrial Exalted (Chosen of the Elemental Dragons, Dragon-Blooded) 
There are five elemental aspects to the Dragon-Blooded: Air, Earth, Fire, Water, and Wood. In the history of Exalted, they were the elite infantry and servants to the rest of the Exalted in the First Age. They are less powerful than other types of Exalted, but most of their strength lies in their inheritance – rather than being chosen by a god, the Dragon-Blooded have the potential to share their Exaltation through their bloodline. With their comparatively massive numbers, along with the help and guidance of the Sidereal Exalted, they were able to overthrow the Solar Exalted at the height of their power and end the First Age.

The most prevalent Dragon-Blooded in Creation make up the ruling class of the Realm, currently the most powerful empire in Creation. The state-sanctioned faith known as the Immaculate Order paints the Solar and Lunar Exalted as dangerous Anathema who will bring ruin to the world if allowed to exist. Because of this, the Realm organizes the Wyld Hunt, which actively seeks out dangers to the Realm (such "Anathema" include many other types of Exalted, rogue gods, and the Fair Folk) and destroys them. This practice had effectively kept the Solars from rising to power again since the end of the First Age, but has faltered with the recent disappearance of the Scarlet Empress and the subsequent power struggle among the Great Houses.

The ruling Dragon-Blooded of the Realm are made up of the eleven Great Houses. Most houses were founded by and named after one of the Scarlet Empress's Exalted offspring, though at least two are descended from the Empress's late husbands and consorts, and three unspecified houses are descended from adopted children of the Empress.

Alchemical Exalted (Chosen of Autochthon, Champions, Colossi, Patropoli/Matropoli) 
 Creations made from clay and the Five Magical Materials, built in the world of Autochthonia. They were introduced in the supplement "Time of Tumult". Alchemicals serve the Great Maker Autochthon, a primordial who assisted the Gods by sharing the secret of Exaltation with them. The Champions are infused with the souls of dead Autochthonian heroes, serving as protectors of a parallel world made up of the body of Autochthon himself, and enforce the will of its theocratic government. They divide themselves into six castes according to which material was mainly used in their construction. Instead of wielding Essence directly and using their Charms in a "magical" fashion like other Exalted do, the Alchemicals have Charms "installed" like peripheral parts. As Alchemical Exalted grow in power, they also increase in size, eventually physically joining with Autochthon and forming living, sapient cities.

The Alchemicals are not subject to the Great Curse, as they did not fight in the Primordial War. In gameplay, in place of curse-driven insanity, they have a Clarity track which measures their psychological distance from humanity. Those Alchemicals who have been infected with Autochthon's illness have a Dissonance track instead, measuring their madness, corruption, and drive to violate boundaries.

Infernal Exalted (Chosen of the Yozis, Akuma and the Green Sun Princes) 
The Yozis — the Primordials who were overthrown but did not die — created the Infernal Exalted from fifty stolen Essences of Solar Exalts. While the first edition hinted at their existence, they did not get official rules until the 2nd edition's Manual of Exalted Power - The Infernals (April 2009).

The Infernals have the full resources of the demon realm at their disposal, along with numerous Yozi cults which already exist in creation, and learn the transformative charms of the Yozis themselves. It is implied that despite currently reveling in their power, the vast majority of Infernal Exalted will grow disillusioned with the alien Yozis and ultimately go rogue. The Infernals' Primordial power gives them the potential to grow into new Titans themselves, not bound by the same shortness of vision their current patrons possess.

Other Exalted 
Three new types of playable Exalted have been announced for 3rd edition: The Liminals, the Getimians and the Exigents.

The Liminals "stand at the border between life and death, humanity and monstrosity". They are created when someone attempts to bring another person back from death; resurrection is explicitly impossible in Exalted, but some will still try. On occasion, this attempt draws the attention of some other power that raises the corpse to life again. The new Liminal possesses the memories of the body that she wears, but does not possess the same soul, and thus do not have the same personality. Like the Dragon-Blooded, they are divided among five aspects—Breath, Blood, Flesh, Marrow, and Soil—depending on the motives of the person who created them.

The Getimian Exalted are heroes who could have changed the world, but instead were never born. The rogue Sidereal Exalt Rakan Thulio has rediscovered their Exaltations, and brought them into the world again to serve in his War Against Heaven. The Getimian Exalted have Essence split into two pools, but unlike the other Exalted types, their charms interact with their separate pools in different ways: Some of their charms can only be powered by one or the other, or cause different effects depending on which one is used.

The Exigents are described by 3rd edition developer Holden Shearer as follows:
A god may petition the Unconquered Sun for the power to Exalt their own champion. If successful, then the God receives the Exigence, which they may use to create their own champion. The process is taxing on a god, and can destroy it in the process. Some Exigences have been sold or otherwise passed into the hands of gods who do not have the Unconquered Sun's approval, while others have been heavily modified from multiple sources; the writers have referred to the former as "black market" Exaltations, and the latter as "dirty bomb" Exaltations.

Other magical beings 
Alongside the various types of Exalts found in Creation, there are also other magical creatures that use the same Essence that Exalts use to power their magical effects. The following are the most prominent types of magical beings.

 Behemoths
 Behemoths are unique, immortal monsters. There are two broad categories of behemoths: Primordial Behemoths, created by the Primordials in the Time of Glory before the Primordial War. Some, now known as Hekatonkheires, were killed during that war and now serve the Neverborn in the Underworld. Wyld Behemoths appear as monsters under the control of Fair Folk, but they are not truly separate beings from their masters, and are merely the aggressive tendencies of powerful Fair Folk come to life.

 Dragon Kings
 The Dragon Kings are not Exalted; they are supernatural creatures offered as a player character type. The Dragon Kings are dinosaurlike beings of great power. Dragon Kings are sworn in allegiance to their creator, the Unconquered Sun, and can remember their past lives with great clarity. Although they once ruled Creation, the majority of their perpetually-reincarnating souls were annihilated during the war against the Primordials. After the First Age ended in war and disease, what remained of their civilization collapsed. They still exist in the Second Age, though hidden in the farthest corners of Creation. Rules for playing Dragon Kings are presented in the Exalted Player's Guide in 1st edition and the Scroll of the Fallen Races in 2nd edition.

 Fair Folk
 Like the Dragon Kings, they are an alternative player character type to the Exalted. They know themselves by their own word, Raksha; however the superstitious in Creation, rightly fearing that to name them is to invoke them, call them the Fair Folk with the hope of flattering and placating them. In one sense, they are very similar to the Primordials: primeval beings whose existences precede and are not bound by the physical reality of Creation. They are natives of the Wyld, which they call Rakshastan – the place that exists between Creation and the Unshaped Chaos.

 The Fair Folks prey upon mortal souls and do a brisk slave trade with The Guild, a powerful economic organization in Creation. The Unshaped are the most powerful of their number, but lack the means to stabilize themselves by assimilating the personhood of mortals and as such are incapable of existing in Creation for any great duration. Rules for playing Fair Folk are presented in Exalted: The Fair Folk in 1st edition; 2nd edition rules are included in Graceful Wicked Masques: The Fair Folk.

 God-Blooded

 Refers to, as a collective whole, offspring of a mortal or animal and a magical being, or the mortal offspring of two magical beings, in which case they take after the more powerful of the two. The resulting offspring bears traces of its mystical parentage. According to the authors, they stand somewhere between divinity and mortality: less than Exalted, but more than human. Those with awakened Essence can purchase the same types of Charms as their supernatural parent, though their power is limited by a low Permanent Essence trait and a small Essence pool.

 There are several subtypes of God-Blooded, mostly named for their supernatural parentage: God-Blooded are the children of gods and elementals, Demon-Blooded are the offspring of demons, Ghost-Blooded are the children of ghosts using powerful Charms to help them reproduce with mortals, and Half-Caste are the children of powerful Exalts (although exceedingly rare). The Fae-Blooded are the children of a union between the Raksha and mortals. The Mountain Folk can also produce God-Blooded offspring, but there is no specific term for them. Rules for playing God-Blooded characters are presented in the Exalted Player's Guide in 1st edition, and Scroll of Heroes in 2nd edition.

 Mountain Folk

 Also known as the Jadeborn, creatures of the Great Maker, Autochthon: when Creation was initially formed by the Primordials, some among the Unshaped were incorporated into the substance of the created world. Sensing that these other, native intelligences of Chaos had been snuffed out in the Creation of inanimate elements, Autochthon took pity on them. Salvaging whatever it could discern of their prior selves, Autochthon resurrected them – still formed of the earthen materials they had calcified into, but alive, and with at least a glimmering memory of the intelligent entities they had once been.

 The Mountain Folk, like many of the Exalted, are divided into Castes: Artisans, Warriors, and Workers. The vast majority of the Mountain Folk are Unenlightened – limited in intelligence, creativity, and supernatural power. A small minority of Workers and Warriors—as well as the entire Artisan Caste—are Enlightened, with much greater creativity as well as both mundane and supernatural potential. Mountain Folk society is ruled by the Artisan Caste, who make up the nobility, with Unenlightened Warriors and Workers making up the commoners and Enlightened Warriors and Workers occupying an intermediate position. Rules for playing the Mountain Folk are presented in 1st edition's Exalted: The Fair Folk and 2nd edition's Scroll of the Fallen Races.

 Spirits

 Spirits are divided into four broad categories: demons, elementals, ghosts, and gods. With the exception of elementals, spirits are naturally immaterial, generally require Charms to materialize in Creation, and will reform when killed unless some supernatural effect prevents them from doing so. Rules for playing ghosts in 1st edition are presented in Exalted: The Abyssals, and rules for 2nd edition are presented in The Books of Sorcery, Vol. V: The Roll of Glorious Divinity II: Ghosts & Demons. Rules for playing elementals and gods are presented in The Books of Sorcery, Vol. IV: The Roll of Glorious Divinity I: Gods & Elementals.

Yozis and Demons
 The Yozis are exiled, imprisoned and twisted Primordials. As the makers of the world and the gods, they are at once grandiose beings and complex pantheons: Each Primordial has multiple souls, which are independent sapient beings in their own right and possess their own sapient spiritual fragments. These souls, and the entities which they craft, birth, or otherwise create, are the demons of Exalted.

 Due to the terms of the Yozis' surrender, all demons can be summoned and bound by a powerful enough sorcerer.

 Elementals
 Elementals maintain Creation, and with a few exceptions, embody one of the five elements: air, earth, fire, water or wood. Elementals are naturally material, requiring charms to dematerialize, and with a few exceptions, cannot reform when slain. Unlike other spirits, their growth is largely unrestricted. The most powerful elementals are the Lesser and Greater Elemental Dragons. Elementals are generally outranked by gods of similar power. While Sorcerers can summon and bind demons through sorcery, the Elementals conjured through a similar spell are brought into being whole-cloth, and frequently cease to exist at the end of their binding.

 The elementals of Autochthonia embody one of the machine world's elements: crystal, metal, oil, lightning or steam, and cannot be summoned through sorcery.

 Ghosts
 The most common type of ghosts, referred to as ghosts or the dead, are the hun or higher souls of mortals who have refused to pass into Lethe and reincarnation due to their attachment to their mortal lives. These ghosts are much weaker than Exalted, and they can only respire Essence in the Underworld and Shadowlands. Hungry ghosts generally come into existence due to betrayal, vengeance or a traumatic death. Initially, a hungry ghost includes both the higher soul and the po, or lower soul, but the hun soon moves on, leaving the hungry ghost largely mindless. Unlike other ghosts, hungry ghosts are naturally material in Creation at night. Nephwracks are ghosts who have been corrupted by the Neverborn. Unlike uncorrupted ghosts, they are capable of using necromancy. The Deathlords are thirteen ghosts of powerful Solar Exalted who have been empowered by the Neverborn, and although they are not technically Exalted, they have access to Abyssal Charms. Spectres, also known as plasmics, are bizarre creatures spawned by the nightmares of the Neverborn. The category of Hekatonkhire includes the ghosts of demons, devas and Primordial behemoths, as well as the manifested nightmares of the Neverborn. The Neverborn are the ghosts of slain Primordials. Immensely powerful, they are difficult to rouse from their slumber, and their power seems largely constrained to the Labyrinth. Only mundane ghosts and Hekatonkhire can be summoned through necromancy, and only mundane ghosts can be summoned through sorcery.

 Gods
 Most gods are members of the Celestial Order, which is stratified into two divisions: the Celestial Court, composed of gods of concepts, and the Terrestrial Bureaucracy, made up of the gods of physical objects and locations. Technically, all members of the Celestial Court outrank all members of the Terrestrial Bureaucracy. In practice, Terrestrial courts are largely independent.

 Outside of the Celestial Order, there are also the machine spirits of Autochthonia, unemployed gods whose domains have been usurped or destroyed, rogue gods who have abandoned their duties, and forbidden gods who have been exiled due to madness, an abhorrent nature or because they sided with the Primordials.

Essence 
Essence is the mystical force which the Exalted and gods manipulate to gain their supernatural powers, as well as the energy that forms all things. Within the game, the mystical force "Essence" is always capitalized to distinguish from other uses of the word.

Magical Materials 
The Magical Materials are used to forge artifacts and weapons. Each material is associated with a type of Exalted, as well as one of the castes of Alchemical Exalted, who are partially constructed from that material. These materials are all easily enchanted, and each one resonates with a particular type of Exalted. This resonance makes any item that is both constructed from one of the magical materials and attuned to an Exalt's anima preternaturally deft and sure in that Exalt's hands. It also gives the Exalt access to the powers of any hearthstone mounted on the item.

 Jade  is the most common material, and is associated with the most common, least powerful of the Exalted, the Terrestrial Exalted. There are five colors of Jade which correspond to one of the Elemental Dragons. Blue jade resonates with Air, white with Earth, black with Water, green with Wood, and red with Fire.

 Starmetal  is the rarest of the magical materials, forged from meteors, and the husks of godlings executed in Yu-Shan, the Heavenly City. Like its wielders, the Sidereal Exalted, Starmetal re-weaves fate and involves itself with divine functions.

 Moonsilver  is considered by the Lunar Exalted to be a gift from their patron, Luna. It must be harvested by moonlight, using no crafted tools, forged at night and cooled only with water that has never seen the sun. Like the protean Lunars, Moonsilver can shift into new forms easily.

 Soulsteel  is made from human souls and the substance of the Labyrinth of the Underworld. It is jet black, and agonized faces of the souls it contains can be seen moving and screaming in the metal. Unsurprisingly, this material is used almost exclusively by the Abyssal Exalted. Soulsteel weapons draw upon the forces of death and the underworld.

 Orichalcum  is used primarily by the Solar Exalted. Orichalcum is rarely found in pure deposits; usually, it is created out of gold that has been heated by lava and sunlight reflected from mirrors of occult design.

 Adamant  a super-solid crystal that is refined down to the sharpest substance known. It is largely present within the body of the Primordial Autochthon, but was also known in Creation during the First Age. This material is used primarily by the Alchemical Exalted, though the Exalted of the First Age occasionally made items out of the material.

Books 
See the list of Exalted sourcebooks for further information.

ReviewsPyramid''

See also 
 Storytelling System.
 White Wolf's World of Darkness.
 White Wolf Publishing

References

External links 
 Exalted Wiki, a Wiki containing fan-created material and archived quotes by the developers

White Wolf Publishing games
Role-playing game systems
Fantasy campaign settings
Fantasy role-playing games
Role-playing games introduced in 2001